Shawn Richard Hill (born April 28, 1981) is a Canadian former professional baseball pitcher. He has played in Major League Baseball (MLB) for the Montreal Expos/Washington Nationals, San Diego Padres and Toronto Blue Jays. He was part of Team Canada at the 2004 Summer Olympics, which finished fourth.

Amateur career
Hill played high-school baseball at Bishop Reding Catholic Secondary School in Milton, Ontario, Canada.

Minor league career
Hill was drafted by the San Diego Padres in the 33rd round, 1,012nd overall, of the 1999 MLB draft, but did not sign. He was drafted the next year draft by the Montreal Expos in the sixth round, 165th overall. In 82 minor league games Hill has a 32–24 record. He has a 3.16 earned run average (ERA) in five minor league seasons, not including 2010. In 14 minor league at-bats, Hill has four hits, one double, two home runs, seven runs batted in (RBIs) and four runs. Hill participated in the 2003 All-Star Futures Game, playing for the World team.

Major league career

Montreal Expos / Washington Nationals
Hill made his MLB debut on June 29, 2004 against the Philadelphia Phillies. Hill went 2 innings, giving up seven hits, four walks, and eight earned runs in a 17–7 loss. On July 4, 2004, Hill was the winning pitcher in what was the final game between two Canadian MLB teams, as the Expos defeated the Toronto Blue Jays, 6–4. Ironically, the game was played at Hiram Bithorn Stadium in San Juan, Puerto Rico, where 21 of Montreal's home games were played in 2004. His final start of 2004 came on July 9, in which he pitched 1 innings, giving up seven hits and seven earned runs in an 11–0 loss against the Pittsburgh Pirates. Overall, Hill finished the season with a 1–2 record and an ERA of 16.00.

Hill missed all of 2005 with Tommy John surgery, and was on Canada's provisional roster for the 2006 World Baseball Classic, but he did not play. Hill returned to make a start for the Washington Nationals on May 27, 2006, against the Los Angeles Dodgers. He pitched seven innings, allowing one earned run and five hits, striking out three batters and walking two. Hill made his last start of 2006 on June 28, following an injury which cut short his season.

In 2007, Hill started the season as the number two pitcher for the Nationals, but emerged as the team's ace early on. In his first seven starts, he lasted six innings or more six times, and allowed two earned runs or less six times. On May 11, he threw five no-hit innings, then took himself out because of elbow soreness, ending up on the 15-day disabled list. He returned on August 14 in a start against the Phillies. He pitched six innings of one-hit ball, while striking out seven and walking only one.

Hill's 2008 season was cut short due to injury. He was placed on the disabled list twice for arm problems before his season was ended on June 25, 2008. Hill underwent arthroscopic surgery to remove bone spurs on his right elbow in September 2008.

During the 2008 offseason, he went to an arbitration hearing with the Nationals, winning the case. Washington paid him $775,000 in 2009, instead of the $500,000 they had offered.

On March 18, 2009, Shawn Hill was released by the Washington Nationals.

San Diego Padres
Hill signed a minor league contract with the San Diego Padres on March 23, 2009. Hill managed to pitch in just 3 starts for the Padres.

On June 24, 2009, Hill had his second Tommy John surgery. On October 8, he was released by the Padres.

Toronto Blue Jays
On January 22, 2010, Hill signed a minor league contract with the Toronto Blue Jays, with an invitation to spring training. Hill spent most of his 2010 season in the minor leagues with the Blue Jays organization, and pitched very well at all stops, the last of which was the Las Vegas 51s, the Jays' Triple-A team. Hill posted a 1.61 ERA in 11 minor league starts in 2010.

On September 6, 2010, Hill was called up to the Toronto Blue Jays. He started on September 9 against the Texas Rangers, in his first major league action in more than 26 months. Hill lasted 5 innings, allowed three earned runs, and was given the loss in a 4–2 game. Hill finished the season compiling a 1–2 record in four starts with a 2.61 ERA and 14 strikeouts in 20 innings pitched. On November 15, 2010, Hill was released by the Blue Jays.

Florida Marlins
On January 29, 2011, Hill signed a minor league contract with the Florida Marlins with an invitation to Spring training.

Hill went on to pitch in just 4 games in Spring training before being released. He did not pitch for any organization in 2011 following his release.

Return to the Blue Jays
On June 18, 2012, the Blue Jays signed Shawn Hill to a minor league contract. On October 4, he was outrighted to the Blue Jays' Triple-A affiliate Buffalo Bisons. Hill elected free agency rather than reporting to the Bisons.

Detroit Tigers

On November 12, 2012, Hill signed a minor league deal with the Detroit Tigers. Hill spent the whole season in the minors, appearing in 26 starts. He recorded a record of 4-14 with a 5.51 ERA in 150.1 innings.

York Revolution
On March 21, Hill signed with the York Revolution.

3rd Stint With Toronto
According to Matt Eddy of Baseball America, Hill signed with the Blue Jays on March 24. He started the season with the Double-A New Hampshire Fisher Cats. He was called up to the Triple-A Buffalo Bisons on May 7, and returned to New Hampshire on June 7.

Chicago White Sox
On June 11, 2014, the Blue Jays traded Hill to the Chicago White Sox, and he was assigned to the Triple A Charlotte Knights. He was released by the Knights on August 10.

2nd Stint With Detroit
In an effort to bolster their minor league rotation with the Triple-A Toledo Mud Hens, Detroit signed Hill to a minor league deal on August 12, 2014.

York Revolution
Hill signed with the York Revolution of the Atlantic League of Professional Baseball for the 2015 season. He became a free agent after the 2015 season.

Scouting report
Hill is a sinker/slider pitcher, when healthy posts groundball rates of over 50%.

Personal life
He is married to the former Ashley Jenne of Melbourne, Florida. He and his wife reside in Viera, Florida in the off-season. He and Ashley have 2 daughters and a son.

See also
List of Major League Baseball players from Canada

References

External links

SportsNet player stats

1981 births
Living people
Baseball people from Ontario
Baseball players at the 2004 Summer Olympics
Baseball players at the 2011 Pan American Games
Baseball players at the 2015 Pan American Games
Brevard County Manatees players
Buffalo Bisons (minor league) players
Canadian expatriate baseball players in the United States
Charlotte Knights players
Clinton LumberKings players
Columbus Clippers players
Dunedin Blue Jays players
Gulf Coast Blue Jays players
Gulf Coast Expos players
Harrisburg Senators players
Las Vegas 51s players
Major League Baseball pitchers
Major League Baseball players from Canada
Montreal Expos players
New Hampshire Fisher Cats players
New Orleans Zephyrs players
Olympic baseball players of Canada
Pan American Games gold medalists for Canada
Pan American Games medalists in baseball
Potomac Nationals players
San Diego Padres players
Sportspeople from Mississauga
Washington Nationals players
Toledo Mud Hens players
Toronto Blue Jays players
Vermont Expos players
World Baseball Classic players of Canada
York Revolution players
2013 World Baseball Classic players
Medalists at the 2015 Pan American Games
Medalists at the 2011 Pan American Games